Washim Lok Sabha constituency was a Lok Sabha (parliamentary) constituency in Maharashtra state in western India from 1977 for 6th Lok Sabha till 2004 elections to 14t Lok Sabha. It was created in 1977 Lok Sabha elections, with abolishment of three term Khamgaon Lok Sabha constituency in neighbouring Buldhana district. This constituency was dissolved when the delimitation of parliamentary constituencies based on the recommendations of the Delimitation Commission of India constituted in 2002 was implemented with the creation of new Yavatmal-Washim Lok Sabha constituency.

Members of Parliament

Washim district
Former Lok Sabha constituencies of Maharashtra
Former constituencies of the Lok Sabha
2008 disestablishments in India
Constituencies disestablished in 2008